The Brownstown Marl is a geologic formation in Arkansas. It preserves fossils dating back to the Cretaceous period.

See also

 List of fossiliferous stratigraphic units in Arkansas
 Paleontology in Arkansas

References

 

Cretaceous Arkansas